Ingrid Haebler (born 20 June 1929) is an Austrian pianist. She studied at the Salzburg Mozarteum, Vienna Music Academy, Conservatoire de Musique de Genève and privately in Paris with Marguerite Long. She toured worldwide. She is best known for a series of recordings from the 1950s to 1980s. Her complete set of Mozart's piano sonatas for the Denon label is still regarded as among the finest sets. Haebler also recorded all of Mozart's piano concertos (most of them twice), often with her own cadenzas – and all of Schubert's sonatas. She was one of several Austrian musicians to experiment early with period instruments, having recorded the keyboard concertos of Johann Christian Bach on a fortepiano, with the Capella Academica Wien under Eduard Melkus, as well as Mozart's keyboard concertos nos. 1-4 with the same ensemble and director for Philips Records. Her recordings of Mozart and Beethoven with the violinist Henryk Szeryng are particularly prized.

Although born in Vienna, Austria, Haebler's parents moved to Poland when she was just three weeks old. She remained there until she was 10. Many celebrated musicians were regular visitors to the Haebler home including Claudio Arrau, Robert Casadesus and Bronislaw Huberman. It was Casadesus who recognised the child's talent as a pianist and predicted a great future for her.

On the outbreak of World War II the family moved to Salzburg where Miss Haebler made her first public appearance at the age of 11. She took up studies at the Mozarteum under Professor Heinz Scholz, graduating in 1949 with distinction for her playing of Mozart and along the way developing a taste for music of the late eighteenth and early twentieth centuries. That same year Haebler won the Lilli Lehmann Medal of the International Mozarteum Foundation.
 
Through the 1950s Ingrid Haebler's repertoire ranged from Bach to Stravinsky and she toured extensively in Europe, North Africa, Australia, the United States, Canada and Japan. She began annual appearances at the Salzburg Festival in 1954.

Notes

External links
"Celebrated musicians' concert tours of Southern Africa 1953 -1978 " Ingrid Haebler 1969, touring Southern Africa

Austrian classical pianists
Austrian women pianists
Musicians from Vienna
1929 births
Living people
University of Music and Performing Arts Vienna alumni
Mozarteum University Salzburg alumni
21st-century classical pianists
Women classical pianists
21st-century women pianists